Kyle Culbertson (born November 3, 1992) is an American soccer player who last played as a defender for USL Championship club Birmingham Legion.

Career
Culbertson played college soccer at Akron University, Columbia University and Ohio State University. While playing college soccer, Culbertson also appeared in the USL PDL for Cincinnati Kings, Mississippi Brilla and Charlotte Eagles.

Puerto Rico FC
After making his way down to Florida, Puerto Rico FC officials described him as "a versatile left-footed player who was highly impressive in the Puerto Rico open try out". Culbertson joined Puerto Rico FC of the North American Soccer League for the club's first season on May 18, 2016. He was released at the end of the 2017 season.

Saint Louis FC
On December 20, 2017, it was announced that Culbertson would join United Soccer League side Saint Louis FC ahead of their 2018 season.

Birmingham Legion
On March 7, 2019, Culbertson joined USL side Birmingham Legion ahead of their inaugural season.

Family 
Kyle's parents are David and Sue Culbertson. He is also married to a woman named Morgan with a daughter named Ellie.

References

1992 births
Living people
Akron Zips men's soccer players
American soccer players
Association football defenders
Birmingham Legion FC players
Charlotte Eagles players
Cincinnati Kings players
Columbia Lions men's soccer players
Mississippi Brilla players
Ohio State Buckeyes men's soccer players
Puerto Rico FC players
Saint Louis FC players
Soccer players from Columbus, Ohio
USL Championship players
USL League Two players